Al-Yaqdha Sport Club is an Iraqi football team based in Al-Qādisiyyah, that plays in Iraq Division Three.

Managerial history
 Mohsin Mohammed 
 Qader Kadhim Nasser
 Hussein Fanteel

See also 
 1990–91 Iraq FA Cup
 1991–92 Iraq FA Cup
 1992–93 Iraq FA Cup
 2000–01 Iraqi Elite League

References

External links
 Al-Yaqdha SC on Goalzz.com
 Iraq Clubs- Foundation Dates

1968 establishments in Iraq
Association football clubs established in 1968
Football clubs in Al-Qādisiyyah